The eighth Annual American Music Awards were held on January 30, 1981.

Winners and nominees

References 
 http://www.rockonthenet.com/archive/1981/amas.htm

American Music Awards